The Lou Groza Award is presented annually to the top college football placekicker in the United States by the Palm Beach County Sports Commission. The award is named after former Ohio State Buckeyes and Cleveland Browns player Lou Groza. It has been presented since 1992, with Joe Allison of Memphis State receiving the inaugural award. The incumbent award holder is Chris Dunn of NC State. The award is part of the National College Football Awards Association coalition.

Winners

References
General
 

Footnotes

External links
Official website

College football national player awards
Awards established in 1992